Belle Vie en Auge is a commune in the department of Calvados, northwestern France. The municipality was established on 1 January 2017 by merger of the former communes of Biéville-Quétiéville (the seat) and Saint-Loup-de-Fribois.

See also 
Communes of the Calvados department

References 

Communes of Calvados (department)